Masataka Yoshida (吉田 正尚 Yoshida Masataka, born July 15, 1993) is a Japanese professional baseball outfielder for the Boston Red Sox of Major League Baseball (MLB). He previously played for the Orix Buffaloes of Nippon Professional Baseball (NPB).

Career

Japanese career
Yoshida played college baseball for Aoyama Gakuin University and was selected by the Orix Buffaloes in the first round of the 2015 NPB draft.

Yoshida first played in NPB for Orix during the 2016 season, when he had a .290 batting average with 10 home runs and 34 runs batted in (RBIs) in 63 games. In 2017, he played 64 games with Orix, batting .311 with 12 home runs and 38 RBIs. In 2018 and 2019, he played 143 games each season, batting .321 and .322, respectively, with an aggregate 55 home runs and 171 RBIs for the two seasons. For 2020 through 2022, he had batting averages of .350, .339, and .335, with a total of 56 home runs and 224 RBIs in 349 games played across the three seasons.

Yoshida hit two home runs in Game 5 of the 2022 Japan Series, including a walk-off; Orix won the series in seven games (one game ended in a tie) over the Tokyo Yakult Swallows.

In seven seasons with Orix—2016 through 2022—Yoshida compiled a .327 batting average along with 467 RBIs and 133 home runs in 762 games.

MLB career
On December 7, 2022, Yoshida was posted by Orix and made available to all 30 Major League Baseball (MLB) teams, opening a 30-day period to negotiate a contract. On December 15, Yoshida signed a five-year contract with the Boston Red Sox, reportedly worth $105.4 million. In January 2023, he was ranked 87th in the Baseball America list of baseball's top 100 prospects, as the publication includes NPB players joining MLB in their rankings. That ranking was considered "alarmingly low" by the Red Sox beat writer with The Boston Globe.

International career 
Yoshida represented the Japan national baseball team in the 2014 Haarlem Baseball Week, 2015 Summer Universiade, 2019 exhibition games against Mexico, and 2019 WBSC Premier12.

On February 27, 2019, he was selected to the 2019 exhibition games against Mexico.

On October 1, 2019, he was selected to the 2019 WBSC Premier12.

References

External links
, or NPB.jp

1993 births
Living people
Aoyama Gakuin University alumni
Nippon Professional Baseball outfielders
Orix Buffaloes players
Baseball people from Fukui Prefecture
People from Fukui (city)
2019 WBSC Premier12 players
2023 World Baseball Classic players
Baseball players at the 2020 Summer Olympics
Olympic baseball players of Japan
Olympic medalists in baseball
Olympic gold medalists for Japan
Medalists at the 2020 Summer Olympics